Elves (Danish: Nisser) is a Danish horror-fantasy-drama streaming television series created by Stefan Jaworski. The first season, containing six episodes, premiered on Netflix on 28 November 2021.

Background
The series was first announced on 6 October 2020. Stefan Jaworski had previously created the show The Rain.

Synopsis
A Danish family travels to the remote island of Aarmandsø to spend Christmas together, away from the city. Unbeknownst to them, the island is inhabited by carnivorous elves. The protagonist of the story and youngest member of the family, Jose, befriends a stranded baby elf, whom they hit with their car while driving to their rented house. Jose names the elf Kee-ko. When the elves start killing people, the family has to fight for their lives.

Cast and characters
 Sonja Sofie Engberg Steen as Jose Svane, a young girl who befriends a baby elf
 Milo Campanale as Kasper, Jose's brother
 Vivelill Søgaard Holm as Liv, an island local
 Lila Nobel as Charlotte, Jose's mother
 Peder Thomas Pedersen as Mads: Jose's father
 Ann Eleonora Jørgensen as Karen, an island local, Liv's grandmother
 Rasmus Hammeric as Møller, an island local and Liv's uncle
 Lukas Løkken as Anders, an island local

Episodes

Reception
The series received mixed reviews. The Guardian gave it a score of 2/5, describing it as "E.T. meets the Wicker Man as murderous gnomes run amok," and described it as "tropey" and "bland". CBR said that it was "too cute" to be considered a horror series, and that it was missing a lot of key elements. The Michigan Daily stated that it becomes increasingly hard to sympathize with Josephine as the series progresses, and said, "(the series) could use some improvement and possibly more likeable characters, but it most definitely doesn't lack creativity. Its chilling and unsettling twist on Christmas is not a familiar phenomenon when it comes to the screen. So while this six-episode fantastical horror may not be Netflix's next acclaimed sci-fi series, it is an addicting watch nonetheless. Nordic Watch praised the series, saying, "combining a Christmas family drama with fantasy, folklore, and horror – on a par with your scariest Doctor Who episode – the series is both disturbingly freaky and heart-warming fun."

In December 2021, Elves was in the top ten most viewed series on Netflix.

See also
 List of Christmas films

References

External links
 
 

2021 Danish television series debuts
Danish-language Netflix original programming
Christmas television series
2020s horror television series
Danish fantasy television series
Elves in popular culture